Susan Ann Banducci,  (born 1966) is an American political scientist and academic. Since 2010, she has been Professor of Politics at the University of Exeter, United Kingdom. Her research focuses on inequalities in political participation, particularly gender. She previously taught at Oregon State University and Texas Tech University, and was a researcher at the University of Waikato, the University of Amsterdam and the University of Twente.

Banducci was awarded a Doctor of Philosophy (PhD) degree in political science by University of California, Santa Barbara in 1995. Her doctoral thesis was titled "Voter confusion and voter rationality: The use of counter-propositions in direct legislation elections", and her doctoral advisor was Eric R.A.N. Smith.

In 2022, Banducci was elected a Fellow of the British Academy (FBA), the United Kingdom's national academy for the humanities and social sciences.

References

Living people
1966 births
American political scientists
Oregon State University faculty
Texas Tech University faculty
Academics of the University of Exeter
Fellows of the British Academy
University of California, Santa Barbara alumni